The Schmutzhart SCH-1 is an American high-wing, single-seat, T-tailed glider that was designed and built by Berthold Schmutzhart.

Design and development
Schmutzhart had already built one glider when he lived in his native Austria. When he moved to the United States in 1958 he decided to design and build a new glider, but was constrained by the dimensions of his small Washington, DC townhouse. As a result, he built a small aircraft that still achieved good performance for its size.

The SCH-1 has a  wingspan and employs a Nickel 17% airfoil, with flaps for glidepath control. The flaps can be set to 0, +4, +45 and +70 °. The basic structure of the SCH-1 is aluminium with some fiberglass fairings. The leading edge wing ribs are made from dense Styrofoam cut with a bandsaw, with the ribs aft of the spar fabricated from cold-formed sheet aluminum. The fuselage was constructed by bending the outside skin onto a jig and then riveting the bulkheads and stringers to the skin from the inside. The wings were built in a similar manner in a jig that held the wing skins, with the ribs then fitted to the skins. Schmutzhart says that the wing skins were formed by being "pressed between the floor, a long board, two lawyers, one architect, a federal bureaucrat and a White House aid". The wing spar is a 6061-T6 aluminum milled I-beam, with the outer spar sections built up from bent flat aluminum stock. The aircraft was originally fitted with an all-flying tail, but this was later modified to a conventional tailplane and elevator.

The aircraft is registered with the Federal Aviation Administration in the Experimental - Amateur-Built category. Only one SCH-1 was built.

Operational history
In June 2011 the SCH-1 was still registered to Schmutzhart, some 34 years after its completion.

Specifications (SCH-1)

See also

References

1970s United States sailplanes
Homebuilt aircraft
Aircraft first flown in 1977